Darwiniella is the scientific name for several genera of organisms and may refer to:

 Darwiniella (crustacean) , a genus of barnacles in the family Pyrgomatidae
 Darwiniella (fungus) , a genus of fungi
 Darwiniella (orchid) , an illegitimate name for a genus of plants in the family Orchidaceae

See also 
 Darwinella, a genus of sponge in the family Darwinellidae